The Woman in Room 13 is a 1932 American pre-Code mystery film directed by Henry King and adapted by Guy Bolton from the play of the same name. The film stars Elissa Landi, Ralph Bellamy, Neil Hamilton, Myrna Loy, Gilbert Roland and Walter Walker. The film was released on May 15, 1932, by Fox Film Corporation.

Plot
Laura Bruce is divorced from her husband following an unpleasant matrimonial term. She then marries Paul Ramsey, whom she has always loved. Dick Turner, his employer and enamored of Laura, sends her husband away on a business trip. A murder is committed and detective John Bruce seeks to fasten the crime upon Paul. After he fails to do so, a happy ending results.

Cast  
Elissa Landi as Laura Ramsey
Ralph Bellamy as John Bruce
Neil Hamilton as Paul Ramsey
Myrna Loy as Sari Loder
Gilbert Roland as Victor Legrand
Walter Walker as Howard Ramsey
Luis Alberni as Peppi Tonelli
Charley Grapewin as Andy

Production

Development
The film is a remake of a 1920 silent film with Pauline Frederick.

References

External links
 
 

1932 films
1930s English-language films
Fox Film films
American mystery films
1932 mystery films
Films directed by Henry King
American black-and-white films
1930s American films